Arthur Arnould (17 April 1833, Dieuze - 26 November 1895) was a French writer, and journalist.

He wrote under the pen name Arthur Matthey. He was a member of the Hermetic Brotherhood of Luxor and the Theosophical Society. He married the widowed painter Delphine de Cool in 1890. He is listed in the French dictionary of anarchists.

References

External links
 
:s:fr:Auteur:Arthur Arnould - on French Wikisource

1833 births
1895 deaths
People from Dieuze
French anarchists
19th-century French writers
Writers from Grand Est
French male writers
19th-century French male writers